Crime in Hungary is combated by the Hungarian police and other agencies.

By type

Corruption
Transparency International's 2022 Corruption Perceptions Index scored corruption in Hungary as the highest of any European Union member state. In 2021, Transparency International described corruption in Hungary as "the long-term consequences of inadequate anti-corruption action".  The same year, a European Commission report expressed frustration at Hungary's lack of progress in fighting corruption: “Risks of clientelism, favouritism and nepotism in high-level public administration, as well as risks arising from the link between businesses and political actors, remain unaddressed.” In 2019, Freedom House downgraded Hungary's status from Free to Partly Free "due to sustained attacks on the country’s democratic institutions by Prime Minister Viktor Orbán’s Fidesz party, which has used its parliamentary supermajority to impose restrictions on or assert control over the opposition, the media, religious groups, academia, NGOs, the courts, asylum seekers, and the private sector since 2010". This was the first time a member of the European Union was designated as Partly Free. In response the Hungarian government stated that "Freedom House is a member of the Soros-empire, is funded by Soros, and is now supporting Soros's electoral campaign. They are attacking Hungary with other Soros-organisations because the Hungarians have decided that they do not want their country to become a migrant haven."

Transparency International's 2022 Corruption Perceptions Index shows that Hungary's score has decreased by thirteen points over the last eleven years. The Index scored Hungary at 42 on a scale from 0 ("highly corrupt") to 100 ("highly clean"). When ranked by score, Hungary ranked 77th among the 180 countries in the Index, where the country ranked first is perceived to have the most honest public sector.  For comparison, the best score was 90 (ranked 1), and the worst score was 12 (ranked 180).

Murder

In 2019, Hungary had 60 intentional homicides at a rate of 0.61 per 100,000 according to the office of the prosecutor general. In 2020, the homicide rate was 0.83 per 100,000.

General
Between 2008–2013, there were an average of 4,000 crimes against every 100,000 members of the population, of which at least 50% were considered serious crimes.
As of 2017 the number of crimes had fallen to 2,315 per 100,000.

By location
Jozsef Hatala of the National Police (ORFK) stated in 2011 that the criminal underworld is strongest in Budapest and its surrounding counties. The murder rate is similar across the counties. In 2016, northern Hungary had the highest number of registered perpetrators of crime per 100,000 inhabitants and Western Transdanubia the lowest.

See also
 Human trafficking in Hungary
 Police corruption in Hungary

References